The Southwest Minnesota State Mustangs football program is a college football team that represents Southwest Minnesota State University in the Northern Sun Intercollegiate Conference, a part of the NCAA Division II.  The team has had 10 head coaches since its first recorded football game in 1968. The current coach is Cory Sauter who first took the position for the 2010 season.

Key

Coaches

Notes

References

Lists of college football head coaches

Minnesota sports-related lists